Aliabad (also Romanized as ‘Alīābād) is a village in Chenarud-e Jonubi Rural District, Chenarud District, Chadegan County, Isfahan Province, Iran. At the 2006 census, its population was 92, in 21 families.

References 

Populated places in Chadegan County